Nathan Pelle is an American actor, producer, author and entrepreneur. He is known for his roles as Reginald Williams on the TV Series Worldstar Headquarters, Martin in the 2012 film Two Jacks, Thomas Knight in the 2015 series  CSI: Cyber and Homeless Skip in the 2022 series Send Help .

Career
Pelle is known for his roles as Reginald Williams on the TV Series Worldstar Headquarters, Martin in the 2012 film Two Jacks, Thomas Knight in the 2015 series CSI: Cyber and Funny Man, Skip in the 2022 series  Send Help.

Beyond entertainment, Pelle is also a serial investor who has  successfully invested in several high technology startups and real-estate projects.  In 2018 Pelle released his 1st book “On a Positive Note” A help book on living a positive lifestyle.

Filmography

Television

Film

References

External links

NathanPelle on Vine

 

Living people
Male actors from New York City
American male film actors
People from the Bronx
20th-century American male actors
21st-century American male actors
African-American male actors
American male television actors
Year of birth missing (living people)
20th-century African-American people
21st-century African-American people